Demissa nevilli is a species of sea snail, a marine gastropod mollusk in the family Marginellidae, the margin snails.

Description

Distribution
This marine species occurs off Madagascar and Réunion.

References

 Jousseaume, F., 1875. Coquilles de la famille des marginelles, Monographie. Revue et Magasin de Zoologie Pure et Appliquée 3(3): 164–278; 429–435
 Fischer-Piette, E. & Beigbeder, J., 1944. Catalogue des types de gastéropodes marins conservés au laboratoire de Malacologie. VI. Mitridae, Marginellidae, Olividae, Columbellidae et Conidae. Bulletin du Muséum national d'Histoire naturelle 16(1): 448–462, sér. 2° série
 Cossignani T. (2006). Marginellidae & Cystiscidae of the World. L'Informatore Piceno. 408pp.
 Boyer F. (2016). Etude d'un nouveau genre de Marginellidae (Mollusca : Neogastropoda) de l'Indo-Pacifique. Xenophora Taxonomy. 10: 31–48.

Marginellidae
Gastropods described in 1875